Jacques Kuba Séguin is an award-winner Canadian and Polish musician and radio host.

Early life 
Séguin was born in Poland to a Québécois father and a Polish mother.

Career 
Séguin is a jazz trumpet player, composer, orchestrator, and radio host. He is most noted for his 2019 album Migrations, which won the Juno Award for Solo Jazz Album of the Year at the Juno Awards 2020 and the Felix Award for Jazz Album of the Year at the 42nd Felix Awards.

He was a leader of several ensembles, such as MiGRATIONS, Litania Projekt, and Odd Lot. He was the winner of the 2012-13 Radio-Canada Revelations prize. In 2015, he was nominated for two ADISQ awards and Prix Opus awards as Best Arranger and Jazz Album of the Year for L’élévation du point de chute. In 2016, he was nominated for two ADISQ awards Litania Projekt with the Quatuor Bozzini best arranger and jazz album of the year.

Séguin performed with others, such as Elizabeth Shepherd, Yves Léveillé, the Jazzlab, Philippe Côté, and Vic Vogel Big band. He tour for two years with Delirium in 150 cities around the world.

Discography 

 ODD LOT (2005)
 ODD LOT 2/3 (2008)
 Litania Projekt (2012)
 ODD LOT: :L'élévation du point de chute (2014) 
 Litania Projekt avec le quatuor Bozzini (2016)
 MiGRATIONS (2019)
 ODD LOT - Compilation 15 ans (2020)

References

External links

21st-century trumpeters
21st-century Canadian male musicians
Canadian jazz trumpeters
Juno Award for Jazz Album of the Year – Solo winners
French Quebecers
Canadian people of Polish descent
Félix Award winners
Musicians from Quebec
Living people
Year of birth missing (living people)